Karl Karekin Turekian (October 25, 1927 – March 15, 2013) was a geochemist and Sterling Professor at Yale University. During his career at Yale, he examined an uncommonly broad range of topics in planetary science — including the sediments of the deep seas, the hot springs of Yellowstone National Park, meteorite strikes, and the composition of moon rocks.

Awards and honors 
 Member of the National Academy of Sciences
 Fellow of the American Academy of Arts and Sciences
 V. M. Goldschmidt Award, The Geochemical Society, 1989
 Maurice Ewing Medal, American Geophysical Union, 1997

References 

1927 births
2013 deaths
American geochemists
Yale University faculty
Yale Sterling Professors
Presidents of the Geochemical Society
Recipients of the V. M. Goldschmidt Award